Hackney Rugby Football Club is a rugby club based in Hackney, London, England. It aims to be the UK's most inclusive rugby club.
It has three burgeoning and vibrant sections, Men's senior teams, Ladies' teams and Junior's teams. It is the fastest growing Rugby club in east London.

Ethos

WE ARE INCLUSIVE

Anyone is welcome at our club, and everyone is encouraged to be involved both on and off the field.
We are drawn from every walk of life and every section of our community, and Hackney Rugby Club is richer for it. The only obstacle to anyone's involvement at any level of our club is their attitude and desire.

WE RESPECT

Everyone who steps onto the field, volunteers their time or allows us to enjoy our game is crucial to our success and we treat them respectfully. This attitude ensures we are honest, hard working and supportive of team-mates.
Hard to earn and easy to lose, every member of our club maintains this respect, and everyone walking through our door is afforded it.

We are drawn from every walk of life and every section of our community, and Hackney Rugby Club is richer for it. The only obstacle to anyone's involvement at any level of our club is their attitude and desire.

WE ARE COMMUNITY

We are part of something bigger than ourselves, be it our club, our sport or our local community. Whenever possible, however we’re able, we give back to that community. Stronger together, we aim to make Hackney Rugby Club the most inclusive, respectful and successful it can be.  Learn more about how Hackney RFC gives back to the community here.

Philosophy
Hackney RFC is a different sort of club. 

Combining a competitive spirit on the pitch with a fierce commitment to building the most welcoming environment off it, our ethos has always been to present an alternative form of rugby.  At the heart of our community club is a desire to lower the barriers to playing the sport we love, and we strive to create the most inclusive rugby family across all of our teams.  

We welcome all new players with open arms; from those who have played at a high level looking to continue competitive rugby, to those for whom it is the first time picking up a rugby ball, and all the casual players in between - Hackney RFC is the club for you.  

Please do get in touch.  We'd love for you to join.  https://www.hackneyrfc.co.uk/

Current Teams

Hackney RFC currently fields three senior men's teams, two women's team, and 12 Juniors & Minis teams, playing home matches at Spring Hill Recreation Ground.

The men's 1st XV competes in London 2 North West. The 2nd XV and 3rd XV compete in the Middlesex Merit League, in the premier and 3rd Divisions respectively. 

The Hackney Gladies compete in Women's NC London & South East Division 2 North and the 2nd team which plays in the Women's NC London & South East Division 3.

Hackney RFC Juniors is the club's thriving youth section, with over 200 children playing from aged 4 up to 17 years old.

The main aim of the club is to create playing opportunities for every group within the London Borough of Hackney and surrounding areas, from mini level continuously up to senior level. The local newspaper, the Hackney Gazette, reports on the club's progress throughout the season.

History
The club was formed in 1965 for former pupils of Woodberry Down Comprehensive School. The newly created Old Griffins Rugby Football Club adopted the school's colours, motto, and the Griffin from the school crest.

The Old Griffins was an open club from its early days, though it only changed its name to Hackney RFC when it entered into negotiations with Hackney Council over the vacant Spring Hill Recreation Ground.

Clubhouse fire
The prospects for Hackney RFC were severely damaged when its clubhouse was destroyed by a fire in April 1999. At the beginning of that season, the club fielded four sides on a regular basis with the 1st XV competing in London 3 (Level 7).

Without facilities, the club lost a large part of its playing base. The club plummeted down through the leagues and in 2004 was playing in Herts/Middlesex North 3 (Level 11), fulfilling its fixtures on an intermittent basis and often playing without a full complement of 15 players. The club had no changing rooms and used the facilities of the Lea Valley Rowing Club. Post-match hospitality was provided by The Swan Public House.
The 1st XV and Ladies 1st XV plays in a quartered kit, with the original 3 colours from the Old Griffins combined with a fourth colour (green) gained from partnering with a French club. The other sides play in variations of the original Old Griffins colours 
The club managed to reverse its decline through good recruitment, player enthusiasm and the unwavering commitment of the club's committee. The 2004/05 and 2005/06 season saw the club fulfill every fixture.

Building on this progress, the club won Herts/Middlesex North 3 but was not promoted to Level 10 due to a restructure of the lower leagues. The club demonstrated that it belonged at a higher level by winning promotion again in the 2008/09 season. This season also saw the launch of a 2nd XV side, nicknamed the Hackney Gargoyles. The club's rugby sevens side also finished runners up in the Middlesex Sevens Jug Competition. The following year, the club fielded a 3rd XV side, now known as the Gogs, for the first time in 12 years. The 2nd and 3rd teams progressed quickly up the Merit league structure with the Gargoyles reaching Merit 1 in 2015.

The Hackney Ladies side were formed in 2010 and soon joined the RFU women's league, gaining promotion in 2013. They continue to expand rapidly and have increased their membership dramatically over the past few years. 

Following a further league championship for the 1st XV in 2014, the club enjoyed a historic season in 2016/17 with the 1st XV going the entire season unbeaten and dropping just one bonus point alongside the 2nd XV becoming league champions and the 3rd XV winning the cup.

Hackney RFC now uses the Spring Hill Recreation Ground changing rooms as its base following its reopening in 2011, though it lost the use of The Swan Public house when the owners sold the premises to a local synagogue. The club now hosts opposition teams at the Lea Rowing Club bar, Spring Hill, London E5 9BL.

Guinness Club Together

In 2009 Hackney RFC won the Guinness Club Together competition, a free programme aimed at supporting grassroots rugby clubs across the UK. Hackney was awarded the title having doubled its playing membership over the previous year despite its lack of facilities.

Hackney travelled to Twickenham on May 16, 2009. Starting with a training session with legendary coach Shaun Edwards (of London Wasps, Wales and The British and Irish Lions) the teams were driven to HQ and ran out onto the hallowed turf as a curtain raiser for the Guinness Premiership final. The Griffins beat the Gargoyles by 12 - 5.

Club Honours
Middlesex 2 champions: 1989–90
Middlesex 1 champions: 1995–96
Herts/Middlesex 3 North champions: 2007–08
Middlesex Senior Vase winners: 2012
Herts/Middlesex 1 champions: 2013–14
London 3 North West champions: 2016–17

Tours
Hackney RFC have recently toured to Madrid, Munich, Budapest, Malta, Portugal, Bulgaria, Romania, Croatia, Czech Republic and France playing against RFC Chaminade, Studentenstadt Munchen RFC, Medvek RFC, Valletta Lions RFC, Sofia RFC, Makarska RFC and AMK Montpellier respectively.

References
Hackney RFC play at Twickenham

External links
Hackney Rugby Football Club Official Site
Middlesex County RFU Website

English rugby union teams
Rugby union clubs in London
Hackney, London